Ben E. Gustafson (born August 6, 1954) is an American politician and businessman.

Gustafson lived in Duluth, Minnesota. He received his bachelor's degree in political science and psychology from University of Minnesota Duluth. He was employed in the financial services industry for over 30 years. Gustafson served in the Minnesota House of Representatives from 1981 to 1985 and was a Democrat. He was Chairman of the Duluth Legislative Delegation and Chairman of the Judicial Administration Subcommittee. Gustafson was the Director of Account Management for Blue Cross Blue Shield of Minnesota and owned and operated Gustafson Financial Group in Largo, FL for 20 years.  His uncle James Gustafson and his father Earl B. Gustafson also served in the Minnesota Legislature.

Notes

1954 births
Living people
Politicians from Duluth, Minnesota
University of Minnesota Duluth alumni
Democratic Party members of the Minnesota House of Representatives